The Actinobacteriophage database, more commonly known as PhagesDB, is a website and database that gathers and shares information related to the discovery, characterization and genomics of viruses that prefer to infect Actinobacterial hosts. It is used to compare phages and their genomic annotations. The database provides information on more than 8,000 bacteriophages, including over 1,600 with already sequenced genomes.

Background
PhagesDB provides the Actinobacteriophage research community with an outlet to post their findings and share it with the members of their community who can then further analyze the data and use it to annotate newly discovered phage genomes through comparison. It was designed to keep up with the speed of discovery so new genes can be uploaded in real time. It is supposed to help avoid the "time-lag between sequencing and availability of annotated genomes in GenBank. It  links students from all over the world who are performing authentic research via the SEA-PHAGES program so they can share their results with the rest of the research community." There are more than 6400 registered PhagesDB users with xxx.edu email addresses, reflecting usage by student researchers.

In 1993, the sequencing of L5 led to the start of the first decade of Actinobacteriophage genomics, and concluded in the publication of an analysis that compared 14 different mycobacteriophage genomes in 2003. Using local spreadsheets and GenBank, it was possible to manage the resulting data for approximately a year, provided that it was at the pace of approximately one genome every year. However, the following two developments made this approach indefensible. First of all, the creation of the Phage Hunters Integrating Research and Education (PHIRE) program  created a path for beginner high school and college scientists to purify, isolate, and characterize their own new phages, leading to a sharp increase in the amount of phage isolates that can be accessed for sequencing. Secondly, the revelation of Next-Generation Sequencing technologies caused a faster and cheaper sequencing of those genomes of phages. As a result, the number of phage genomes sequenced in the next decade exponentially increased. The foundation of the Science Education Alliance-Phage Hunters Advancing Genomics and Evolutionary Science (SEA-PHAGES) program in 2008  increased the pipeline more for isolation and sequencing of Actinobacteriophage, and coping with the data created by these programs brought a challenge.

PhagesDB was created to be a single, concentrated archive of phage information where anyone interested in or involved with phage study could access and enter data. A web-accessible database sample allowed the storage and retrieval of data in a methodical and pliable way, as well as giving easy access to anyone with an   connection to internet. In April 2010, PhagesDB launched, and was initially only for Mycobacteriophages (phages of mycobacterial hosts). In 2015, it became the Actinobacteriophage Database to contain all phages infecting hosts in the Phylum Actinomycetota.

Design and features 
The creation of PhagesDB was carried out using Django and was hosted on a WebFaction server. Django is a Python-based web-development framework, and it was chosen specifically  for its high versatility, accessibility to non-professional programmers, clarity of documentation, and several other out-of-the-box features including a fully functional administrative site. It was important for it to have accessibility to non-professional programmers as that allows for a more diverse range of results. Rather than host PhagesDB locally, WebFaction was chosen for its easy integration with Django, its high-level data security and its low downtime. The database website opens up with a mostly green and black lobby page and on the top left, a search bar is present. Phage names can be, sequenced and/or draft, typed in the search bar and results immediately pop up.

PhagesDB has an individual phage page for every single phage out of the more than 8000 phages that have been entered into the database. These pages contain detailed information regarding the phages. This information includes discovery details (GPS coordinates, year found, isolation temperature, host bacterium, etc.), sequencing details (genome length, G + C content, type of genome termini, etc.), characterization details (morphotype, cluster/subcluster, gene list, etc.) and further useful files (fasta sequence file, plaque picture, restriction digest picture, micrograph, etc.). If applicable, there are links to the GenBank entry for the phage, as well as the paper it was published in. Along with all these, there is a separate GeneMark page for each phage which allows one to  cross reference the position of genomes within the draft phages to ensure that there is indeed a genome present at a certain spot. PhagesDB can be used on its own but is found to be more accurate when used in collaboration with another bioinformatics website like NCBI Blast. The figure below indicates the different types and numbers of phages sequenced:

There are many different ways in PhagesDB where the user is able to view and contact with groups of phages. Phage lists can be generated and classified by host (genus, species, or strain), cluster, subcluster, institution, year found, genome length, G + C content and a few other criteria. The filter page lets for a combination of criteria to aim at a group of phages with particular characteristics. Each phage cluster and subcluster has its own page with a catalog of member phages. Along with this each cluster and subcluster has days present about itself as well, for example number of members in the clusters, their average genome sizes, and the hosts their members infect or prefer to infect. There is an interactive map that shows all phages/clusters that are sequenced with known GPS coordinates. This gives information about the geographical spread of phage locations of isolation. The compare page lets users view all plaque pictures, limitation digest pictures, or micrographs for a given phage group. PhagesDB has amino-acid level details about its phage genomes that are sequenced by integration with Phamerator

Access and rights to data 
PhagesDB data can be viewed by anyone freely and anyone can register for the site (through Google, Facebook, Twitter, or PhagesDB itself), giving the ability to add new phages that have been found, and modify the phage data while learning more about the characteristics of phages.

Additionally, the site gives multiple ways of bringing back the fundamental data. The download page of the data consists of links for downloading all sequences of phage genome, texts about each phage with a broad information, and photos with all plaque images, restriction digest gel pictures, or micrographs for any given cluster. Each Pham page provides a link to download the amino acid sequences of all members of that Pham for comparative proteomic motives.

An Application Programming Interface (API) was recently added to let users approach a lot of underlying data in a way more compatible for computers. The PhagesDB API receives appeals for all phages, the ones by host, by cluster or subcluster, sequenced, etc., and reverts json objects with the wanted information. PhagesDB keeps some unpublished data that is not present in any medium, including genome sequences that have been done recently. The PhagesDB ‘Terms of Use’ contains instructions on how and which data shall be used by third parties. For instance, users willing to take advantage of unpublished data for their private purposes need permission from the owners of data.

See also 

 Bioinformatics
 Genomics
 Mycobacteria
 Bacteriophage
 DNA sequencing
 BLAST

References

External links
 Homepage
 Phamerator
 HHpred
 Glossary of phage terms

Biological databases
Virology
Bioinformatics software